This is a list of airlines of Canada which have one or more of the following; an Air Operator Certificate issued by Transport Canada, an ICAO airline designator, call sign or aircraft registered with Transport Canada. Please see lists of airlines by provinces or territories for sorted lists.

Note: Airlines in  have scheduled passenger service.

See also 
 List of defunct airlines of Canada
 Lists of airlines
 List of airports in Canada

References

 
Canada
Airlines
airlines
Canada